The 1899 North Carolina Tar Heels football team represented the University of North Carolina in the 1899 Southern Intercollegiate Athletic Association football season.  They played eleven games with a final record of 7–3–1. The team captain for the 1899 season was Samuel Shull.

Former Sewanee head coach John Gere Jayne (Princeton '97) was hired as an assistant coach.

Schedule

References

North Carolina
North Carolina Tar Heels football seasons
North Carolina Tar Heels football